Guantanamera Publishing's goal is to promote their books in the international arena and translate them into other languages. The publishing house was established in Seville, Spain in 2017. It made its first appearance at the International Book Fair in Havana, Cuba. The label is part of Lantia Publishing Group, a technology company with its headquarters Seville, Spain.

History 

The Publishing Director, Daniel Pinilla, started this project in conjunction with Lantia Publishing to serve as a way to create more visibility for Cuban literature. The project focuses on cuban authors in general and, in particular, an Invisible Generation of authors many of whom have not had the opportunity to be published nor enter into the international literary market.

In 2017, after several months of searching for talent, Guantanamera Publishing officially presented its first catalog in the International Book Fair in Havana, where it had its own stand. Several books were presented in the Fair, such as La Calle de al Comedia by Eduardo del Llano and Diario de un poeta recién cazado by Jesús David Curbelo. This event captured the attention of news outlets and a large number of Cuban authors expressed interest in publishing their works with Guantanamera Publishing.

At the London Book Fair in 2017, Guantanamera Publishing made its international debut and Publishers Weekly ran a cover story on the label increasing its visibility and attracting even more authors and news stories, in publications such as Diario Granma and internationally in the Agencia EFE.

In February 2018, the Publisher announced the I Premio Guantanamera, an annual award that would include all books in the catalog up to May of the award year. The prestigious Literary Agency Carmen Balcells, founded by Carmen Balcells and considered the fundamental instigator of the Latin American Boom of the 1960s and 1970s, will be responsible for selecting the winner. The award will be presented in Barcelona in September 2018.

Also, in February 2018, the magazine 14ymedio, an independent Cuban magazine founded by Yoani Sánchez, stated that several of the books that were sent to the Book Fair in Havana by Guantanamera were confiscated by the Cuban authorities due to customs problems.

References

External links
https://us.invertalia.net/news/guantanamera-the-only-publishing-stamp-for-cuban-authors-shines-in-miami-12636

Publishing companies of Spain
Seville
Spanish companies established in 2017
Cuban literature